Rigor Mortis  is a 2013 Hong Kong horror film directed by Juno Mak and produced by Takashi Shimizu. The film is a tribute to the Mr. Vampire film series. Many of the former cast are featured in this film: Chin Siu-ho, Anthony Chan, Billy Lau and Richard Ng.   Additionally, Chung Fat, who starred in Encounters of the Spooky Kind, is also featured.

Plot 
Actor Chin Siu-ho, former star of Mr. Vampire, is suicidal after his wife and young son leave him. He moves into a dilapidated apartment building and hangs himself. His struggles draw the attention of twin girl ghosts who haunt the apartment, and they possess his body. Yau, a neighbor, bursts into the room, cuts the noose, and drives the spirits from Chin's body. Later, Chin visits Yau's restaurant, and Yau explains that his family are jiangshi (vampire)-hunters, but he has grown weary and taken up cooking instead especially glutinous rice which is used against vampires.

Elsewhere in the apartment building, an elderly man named Uncle Tung falls down a stairwell after encountering a ghost and dies. His wife Meiyi asks Gau, a black magician living in the building, to resurrect Tung. Gau performs a ritual on the disfigured corpse and explains that Tung will revive after several days. Gau instructs Meiyi not to remove the mask he has put on Tung's face.

Chin meets Yang Feng, a traumatized single mother, and her son, Pak. Chin learns from the apartment's security guard, Uncle Yin, that Yang and Pak previously lived in the unit he now occupies, and that the twin ghosts haunting the apartment were students being tutored there by Yang's husband. The husband raped one of the twins and was then stabbed by the other, who herself received mortal wounds in the scuffle. The remaining twin, distraught, hung herself. These ghosts caused Yang to flee the apartment. Chin resolves to banish the ghosts so that Yang and Pak can move in with him.

After Yau refuses to help, Chin returns to his room, and is ambushed by Gau, who performs a ritual on him that summons the twins. They possess Chin again and attack Gau. Yau rushes in, and together, Gau and Yau exorcise the ghosts from Chin, binding them in a cabinet. Yau instructs Gau to burn the cabinet: Gau promises to, but instead secretly keeps the cabinet.

Meiyi, frustrated that her husband Tung has still not resurrected, demands more help from Gau. Gau admits that virgin's blood might speed the resurrection process. Uncle Yin, investigating Tung's absence, interrupts their discussion as he is suspicious of Gau's knowledge of black magic. When he asks Gau about Tung, Meiyi beats Yin to death with a pot. Later, young Pak visits Meiyi alone. Meiyi hesitates only briefly before locking the virginal Pak in the bathroom with Tung's monstrous corpse. Against Gau's instructions, Meiyi has removed the warding mask from Tung's face. Tung revives and horrifically murders the child as Meiyi listens, tears streaming down her face.

Sensing powerful evil, a vampire hunting artifact on Yau's wall begins to react. Yau rushes to Gau's apartment. He finds Gau mortally wounded, savaged by the revived Tung. Gau confesses that Tung has risen as a jiangshi and will haunt the apartment complex. Moreover, Gau was responsible for Tung's original death, having thrown him over the rails after it turned out Tung had survived the initial fall. Gau explains that he is terminally ill, and he had planned to bind the twin ghosts' souls in Tung's soulless body to gain power and extend his own life. By removing Tung's mask, Meiyi has let the jiangshi run amok. Yau alerts Chin, who rushes off to find Yang.

Yang, searching for her missing son Pak, unwittingly opens the cabinet containing the ghost twins. Invisible, they escape. Yang encounters Pak, who to her dismay is now a ghost. Enraged, she tracks down the jiangshi and attempts to destroy it using an improvised mace, but she is severely outmatched and it ultimately kills her. Chin arrives seconds later and sets the jiangshi aflame with a Molotov cocktail; while this appears to barely damage it, in the ensuing struggle the jiangshi crashes into a store of rice, and is immobilized. However, the twin ghosts appear and eagerly possess Tung's corpse. Revived, the powerful ghost-infused jiangshi easily impales Chin through the stomach with a pole and leaves him for dead.

Chin, terribly injured is found by Yau as he prepares to battle the jiangshi. Yau uses a spell to stop Chin's bleeding. Chin insists on helping, even though Yau warns him he will die. Using vampire hunting tools, Yau sets a trap that temporarily binds Tung to that location, allowing Chin to fight him. Yau uses his tools to weaken Tung, but Chin is unable to gain the upper hand before the trap expires. Yau sees that it is now dawn and drags the entangled Chin and Tung out a window, where they fall into the courtyard. The sunlight immediately begins to burn the vampire and the twin spirits are forced out. As Tung crumbles to ash, his humanity briefly returns when he witnesses Meiyi slit her own throat. Chin and Yau collapse from exhaustion.

In the final sequence, the audience learns that Chin was actually successful in committing suicide, and that the events the film chronicles were created by Chin's dying mind in the process leading to rigor mortis. In reality, the film's characters are people Chin passed on the way to his apartment: Yang and Pak are friendly neighbors, Meiyi is a widow admiring a picture of a late Tung, and Yau is a neighbor who rushes in too late to save the hanged Chin. At the morgue, Chin's adult son identifies the body for the medical examiner, Dr. Gau.

Cast
 Chin Siu-ho as Chin Siu-ho
 Anthony Chan as Yau
 Kara Wai as Yang Feng
 Chung Fat as warlock Gau
 Lo Hoi-pang as janitor Uncle Yin, or Grandpa
 Richard Ng as Uncle Tung
 Paw Hee-ching as Auntie Meiyi
 Morris Ho as Pak
 Billy Lau as the cook

Release
Rigor Mortis premiered at the Venice Film Festival.

Reception
Rotten Tomatoes, a review aggregator, reports that 68% of 22 surveyed critics gave the film a positive review; the average rating was 6.02/10. Metacritic rated it 53/100 based on 8 reviews. Clarence Tsui of The Hollywood Reporter called it "a lavish, heavy-handed retreading and reinvention of Hong Kong and Japanese horror-film tropes, saved from clinical inhumanity by its veteran cast." Justin Chang of Variety described it as a "flashy, incoherent and virtually scare-free Hong Kong horror exercise". Daniel M. Gold of The New York Times called it a "relentlessly creepy film" that uses less comedy than Mr. Vampire. Martin Tsai of the Los Angeles Times wrote, "The film supplies a succession of hyper-stylized and potent set pieces without ever establishing any sort of internal logic."

References

External links
 
 
 
 
 

2013 films
2013 horror films
2010s comedy horror films
Hong Kong comedy horror films
2010s Cantonese-language films
Films set in apartment buildings
Jiangshi films
Martial arts comedy films
Martial arts horror films
Hong Kong supernatural horror films
Supernatural comedy films
Vampire comedy films
2013 directorial debut films
2013 comedy films
Resurrection in film
2010s Hong Kong films